Mayenburg is a surname. Notable people with the surname include:

 Marius von Mayenburg (born 1972), German playwright, translator, and instructor.
 Ottomar von Mayenburg (1865–1932), German pharmacist and inventor of toothpaste Chlorodont
 Ruth von Mayenburg (1907–1993), Austrian journalist, writer, and translator

German-language surnames